Jeremy Buendia is an American professional bodybuilder who competes in the IFBB Men's Physique Division. He is a four time Olympia Champion.

Jeremy Buendia was born in Roseville, California. During high school, Buendia was a linebacker at Whitney High School. Due to the rigorous nature of American football, Buendia sustained injuries to the discs in his neck and back. In part due to this injury, Buendia gained interest in the sport of bodybuilding. Buendia has stated that he was familiar with the principles of bodybuilding as his father was a non-competitive bodybuilder in the 1970s. Buendia began participating in bodybuilding competitions at the age of 17.

	
Jeremy Buendia has been competing professionally within the International Federation of Bodybuilding and Fitness (IFBB) since 2013, where he placed 2nd in the Mr. Olympia Men's Physique class. He subsequently earned the Men's Physique Olympia title in 2014, 2015, 2016, and 2017. He placed 4th in the Men's Physique Olympia 2018,

References

External links
Official website
Men’s Physique: The Ultimate Guide (2016 Guide)
Jeremy Buendia men’s physique (Interview in Spanish)
NPC PHYSIQUE CHAMPION JEREMY BUENDIA TALKS WITH SIMPLYSHREDDED.COM
Jeremy Buendia on Bodybuilding.com

1990 births
Living people
American bodybuilders